This is a select bibliography of English language books (including translations) and journal articles about the history of Belarus and Byelorussia. A brief selection of English translations of primary sources is included. Book entries have references to journal articles and reviews about them when helpful. Additional bibliographies can be found in many of the book-length works listed below; see Further Reading for several book and chapter-length bibliographies. The External links section contains entries for publicly available select bibliographies from universities.

Inclusion criteria
Geographic scope of the works include the historical areas of Byelorussia and contemporary Belarus. Works about other regions are included when they contain substantial material related to the history of Belarus and Byelorussia.

Included works should either be published by an academic or notable publisher, or be authored by an independent notable subject matter expert and have reviews in significant independent scholarly journals. This bibliography specifically excludes non-history related works; self-published works; magazines and newspaper articles; works produced as propaganda; and works produced by non-academic government entities.

Formatting and citation style
This bibliography uses APA style citations. Entries do not use templates; references to reviews and notes for entries do use citation templates. Where books which are only partially related to the history of Belarus and Byelorussia are listed, the titles for chapters or sections should be indicated if possible, meaningful, and not excessive.

If a work has been translated into English, the translator should be included and a footnote with appropriate bibliographic information for the original language version should be included.

When listing book titles with alternative English spellings, the form used in the latest published version should be used and the version and relevant bibliographic information noted if it previously was published or reviewed under a different title.

General surveys

 Savchenko. (2009). Belarus: A Perpetual Borderland. Leiden: Brill.

Regional studies
This sections contains works about Eastern Europe with significant content about Belarus.
 Applebaum, A. (2013). Iron Curtain. The Crushing of Eastern Europe 1944–56. New York: Penguin.
 Fritz, V. (2007). State-Building: A Comparative Study of Ukraine, Lithuania, Belarus, and Russia (1st ed.). Budapest: Central European University Press. 
 Hoffman, E. (1993). Exit into History: A Journey Through the New Eastern Europe. New York: Viking Press.
 Howard, A. (Ed.). (1993). Constitution Making in Eastern Europe. Washington, D.C.: Woodrow Wilson Center Press.
 Kenney, P. P. (2013). The Burdens of Freedom: Eastern Europe since 1989 (Global History of the Present). London: Zed Books.
 Geremek, B. (1996). The Common Roots of Europe. Cambridge: Polity Press.
 Snyder, T. (2004). The Reconstruction of Nations: Poland, Ukraine, Lithuania, Belarus, 1569–1999. New Haven: Yale University Press.
 Ther, P. (2016). Europe Since 1989: A History (C. Hughes-Kreutzmüller, Trans.). Princeton: Princeton University Press.
 Wolff, L. (1994). Inventing Eastern Europe: The Map of Civilization on the Mind of the Enlightenment. Palo Alto: Stanford University Press.

Borderland studies
 Marples, D. R. (1985). Western Ukraine and Western Belorussia under Soviet Occupation: The Development of Socialist Farming, 1939-1941. Canadian Slavonic Papers / Revue Canadienne Des Slavistes, 27(2), 158–177. 
 Rieber, A. J. (2014). The Struggle for the Eurasian Borderlands: From the Rise of Early Modern Empires to the End of the First World War. Cambridge: Cambridge University Press.
 Snyder, T. (2010). Bloodlands: Europe Between Hitler and Stalin. New York: Basic Books.
 Staliūnas, D. (2007). Between Russification and Divide and Rule: Russian Nationality Policy in the Western Borderlands in mid-19th Century. Jahrbücher Für Geschichte Osteuropas, 55(3), 357–373.
 Staliūnas, D., & Aoshima, Y., (eds.). (2021). The Tsar, the Empire, and the Nation: Dilemmas of Nationalization in Russia's Western Borderlands, 1905–1915. Historical Studies in Eastern Europe and Eurasia. Budapest: Central European University Press.
 Thaden, E. (1984). Russia’s Western Borderlands, 1710-1980, Princeton, N.J.: Princeton University Press.
 Ther, P., & Kreutzmüller, C. (2014). The Dark Side of Nation-States: Ethnic Cleansing in Modern Europe. New York: Berghahn Books.

Period studies

Early Slavs and Byelorussians

 Bocek, V., Jansens, N., & Klir, T. (Eds.). (2020). New Perspectives on the Early Slavs and the Rise of Slavic: Contact and Migrations. Heidelberg: Universitatsverlag Winter.
 Dolukhanov, P. (2016). The Early Slavs: Eastern Europe from the Initial Settlement to the Kievan Rus. London: Routledge.I
 Dvornik, F. (1956). The Slavs: Their Early History and Civilization. Boston, MA: American Academy of Arts and Sciences.
 Halperin, C. J. (2010). National Identity in Premodern Rus'. Russian History, 37(3), 275–294. 
 Plokhy, S. (2010). The Origins of the Slavic Nations: Premodern Identities in Russia, Ukraine, and Belarus. Cambridge, UK: Cambridge University Press.
 Pritsak, O. (1991). The Origin of Rus. Cambridge MA: Harvard University Press.

Pre-Soviet Byelorussia
 Blum, J. (1971). Lord and Peasant in Russia from the Ninth to the Nineteenth Century. Princeton, NJ: Princeton University Press.

Soviet Byelorussia
 Exeler, F. (2022). Ghosts of War: Nazi Occupation and Its Aftermath in Soviet Belarus. Cornell University Press. 
 Maksymiuk, J. (2003). Belarus: Freedom to Submit. Foreign Policy, 139, 35–37. 
 Snyder, T. (2010). Bloodlands: Europe Between Hitler and Stalin. New York: Basic Books.
 Urban, M. (2009). An Algebra of Soviet Power: Elite Circulation in the Belorussian Republic 1966-86 (Cambridge Russian, Soviet and Post-Soviet Studies). Cambridge: Cambridge University Press.

World War II in Byelorussia

The Holocaust in Byelorussia

 Bartov, O. (2008). Eastern Europe as the Site of Genocide. The Journal of Modern History, 80(3), 557–593. 
 Beorn, W. W. (2014). Marching into Darkness: The Wehrmacht and the Holocaust in Belarus. Harvard University Press.
 Gaunt, D., Levine, P. A., & Palosuo, L. (2004). Collaboration and Resistance During the Holocaust: Belarus, Estonia, Latvia, Lithuania. Peter Lang.
 Walke, A. (2018). Split Memory: The Geography of Holocaust Memory and Amnesia in Belarus. Slavic Review, 77(1), 174–197.

Chernobyl

 Antanovich, I. J. (1996). Letter from Belarus: legacy of the Chernobyl nuclear incident. Environmental Conservation, 23(4), 287–288. 
 Zhukova, E. (2017). Foreign aid and identity after the Chernobyl nuclear disaster: How Belarus shapes relations with Germany, Europe, Russia, and Japan. Cooperation and Conflict, 52(4), 485–501.

Independent Belarus
 Bennett, B. (2011). Last Dictatorship in Europe: Belarus Under Lukashenko. Oxford University Press.
 Frear, M. (2018). Belarus under Lukashenka: Adaptive Authoritarianism (Routledge Series on Russian and East European Studies). London: Routledge.
 Jarábik, B. (2006). Belarus Today: Country between East and West. International Issues & Slovak Foreign Policy Affairs, 15(2), 10–17. 
 Marples, D. (2014). Our Glorious Past: Lukashenka's Belarus and the Great Patriotic War. Stuttgart: ibidem Press, Columbia University Press.
 Motlagh, J. (2011). Dark Days in Belarus: Surviving the Soviet Hangover in the former USSR's last dictatorship. The Virginia Quarterly Review, 87(4), 70–93. 
 Nesvetailov, G. (1995). Changing Centre-Periphery Relations in the Former Soviet Republics: The Case of Belarus. Social Studies of Science, 25(4), 853–871. 
 Silitski, V. (2006). Still Soviet? Why Dictatorship Persists in Belarus. Harvard International Review, 28(1), 46–53. 
 Wilson, A. (2012). Belarus: The Last European Dictatorship. Yale University Press.

Russia-Belarus Union
 Deyermond, R. (2004). The State of the Union: Military Success, Economic and Political Failure in the Russia-Belarus Union. Europe-Asia Studies, 56(8), 1191–1205. 
 Koktysh, K. (2006). The Belarusian Policy of Russia: the Era of Pragmatism. International Issues & Slovak Foreign Policy Affairs, 15(2), 18–29.

Topical studies
 Abstracts: Contours and Contrasts. A Closer Look at Belarus. (2004). Osteuropa, 54(2), 256–260. 
 Eke, S. M., & Kuzio, T. (2000). Sultanism in Eastern Europe: The Socio-Political Roots of Authoritarian Populism in Belarus. Europe-Asia Studies, 52(3), 523–547.

Political
 Balmaceda, M. M. (2014). Living the High Life in Minsk: Russian Energy Rents, Domestic Populism and Belarus' Impending Crisis (New edition). Central European University Press.
 Korosteleva, Elena A. (2016). The European Union and Belarus: Democracy promotion by technocratic means?. Democratization. 23(4): 678–698.
 Leshchenko, N. (2008). The National Ideology and the Basis of the Lukashenka Regime in Belarus. Europe-Asia Studies, 60(8), 1419–1433. 
 Marples, D. R. (2006). Color Revolutions: The Belarus case. Communist and Post-Communist Studies, 39(3), 351–364. 
 Nikolayenko, O. (2007). Web Cartoons in a Closed Society: Animal Farm as an Allegory of Post-Communist Belarus. PS: Political Science and Politics, 40(2), 307–310. 
 Sannikov, A. (2006). Belarus: Dictatorship in the EU Neighborhood. International Issues & Slovak Foreign Policy Affairs, 15(2), 3–9.

Social
 Tomiak, J. (1992). Education in the Baltic States, Ukraine, Belarus’ and Russia. Comparative Education, 28(1), 33–44. 
 Vashchilko, A. (2014). Household Expenditure Patterns, Equivalence Scales, and Poverty in Belarus. Eastern European Economics, 52(6), 92–108.

Violence and terror
 Demaret, L. (2002). Clampdown in Belarus. International Union Rights, 9(1), 19–19. 
 Martin, T. (1998). The Origins of Soviet Ethnic Cleansing. The Journal of Modern History, 70(4), 813–861. 
 Shaton, G. (2009). Academic Freedom in Belarus. Social Research, 76(2), 615–618. 
 Vanderhill, R. (2014). Promoting Democracy and Promoting Authoritarianism: Comparing the Cases of Belarus and Slovakia. Europe-Asia Studies, 66(2), 255–283.

Religion
 Titarenko, L. (2010). Religious Pluralism in Post-communist Eastern Europe: The Case of Belarus. Anthropological Journal of European Cultures, 19(1), 40–53.

Economics
 Li, Y., & Cheng, E. (2020). Market Socialism in Belarus: An Alternative to China’s Socialist Market Economy. World Review of Political Economy, 11(4), 428–454. 
 Nuti, D. M. (2000). Belarus: A Command Economy without Central Planning. Russian & East European Finance and Trade, 36(4), 45–79. 
 Yarashevich, V. (2014). Post-communist Economic Integration: Belarus, Kazakhstan, and Russia. Journal of Economic Integration, 29(4), 582–623.

Rural studies and agriculture
 Smilovitsky, L. (1997). The Jewish Farmers In Belarus During The 1920s. Jewish Political Studies Review, 9(1/2), 59–71.

Urban studies and industry
 Under construction

Historiography, identity, and memory studies
Historiography
 Wolff, L. (2006). Revising Eastern Europe: Memory and the Nation in Recent Historiography. The Journal of Modern History, 78(1), 93–118.

Identity and language
 Bekus, N. (2010). Struggle over Identity: The Official and the Alternative “Belarusianness” (Illustrated edition). Budapest: Central European University Press.
 Brown, T. (2013). Key Indicators of Language Impact on Identity Formation in Belarus. Russian Language Journal / Русский Язык, 63, 247–288. 
 Burant, S. R. (1995). Foreign Policy and National Identity: A Comparison of Ukraine and Belarus. Europe-Asia Studies, 47(7), 1125–1144. 
 Halperin, C. J. (2010). National Identity in Premodern Rus'. Russian History, 37(3), 275–294. 
 Ioffe, G. (2003). Understanding Belarus: Belarusian Identity. Europe-Asia Studies, 55'''(8), 1241–1272. 
 Ioffe, G. (2003). Understanding Belarus: Questions of Language. Europe-Asia Studies, 55(7), 1009–1047. 
 Klinke, I. (2008). Geopolitical Narratives on Belarus in Contemporary Russia. Perspectives, 16(1), 109–131. 
 Rudling, P. A. (2014). The Rise and Fall of Belarusian Nationalism, 1906–1931. University of Pittsburgh Press.

Memory studies
 Marples, D. (2014). Our Glorious Past: Lukashenka's Belarus and the Great Patriotic War. Stuttgart: ibidem Press, Columbia University Press.
 Walke, A. (2018). Split Memory: The Geography of Holocaust Memory and Amnesia in Belarus. Slavic Review, 77(1), 174–197.

Biographies
Works below should strictly follow the guidelines for this bibliography. To avoid abuse, works here should have independent English language academic journal reviews, be published by a major independent company or organization, or reviews by major English language publications (e.g. New York Times, The Atlantic).
 Under construction

Primary sources
 Belarus Republic-Russian Federation: Treaty On The Formation Of The Community Of Belarus And Russia. (1996). International Legal Materials'', 35'(5), 1190–1194.

Academic journals

Further reading
Works with significant recent bibliographies related to Belarus and Byelorussia.
 Under construction

See also
 Bibliography of the history of Poland
 Bibliography of Russian history
 Bibliography of the Soviet Union
 Bibliography of Ukrainian history

References

Notes

Citations

External links
Below are online bibliographies related to Belarus from academic and professional historical organizations. 
 National Bibliography of Belarus, University of Illinois Library.
 Belarusian Publishing in the West: A Bibliography--Periodicals, New York Public Library.

Belarus